Gaston Féry (24 April 1900 – 29 November 1985) was a French sprinter who participated in 1920s Olympic Games.

Born in Longwy, département Meurthe et Moselle, he competed at the 1920 and 1924 Summer Olympics in the 400 metre and 4×400 metre relay and finished third and fifth in the relay, respectively; he failed to reach the finals in his individual events. Nationally, Féry won six 400 metre titles in 1919–1924. He later co-founded the Sports Club of Meudon, where he played and coached association football.

He died in Paimpol, département Côtes-d'Armor.

References

1900 births
1985 deaths
Athletes (track and field) at the 1920 Summer Olympics
Athletes (track and field) at the 1924 Summer Olympics
French male sprinters
Medalists at the 1920 Summer Olympics
Olympic athletes of France
Olympic bronze medalists for France
Olympic bronze medalists in athletics (track and field)
People from Longwy
Sportspeople from Meurthe-et-Moselle
20th-century French people